The Cahokia Mounds State Historic Site  (11 MS 2) is the site of a pre-Columbian Native American city (which existed  1050–1350 CE) directly across the Mississippi River from modern St. Louis, Missouri. This historic park lies in south-western Illinois between East St. Louis and Collinsville.

Cahokia was the largest and most influential urban settlement of the Mississippian culture, which developed advanced societies across much of what is now the Central and the Southeastern United States, beginning more than 1,000 years before European contact. Today, the Cahokia Mounds are considered to be the largest and most complex archaeological site north of the great pre-Columbian cities in Mexico.

Cahokia Mounds is a National Historic Landmark and a designated site for state protection. It is also one of the 24 UNESCO World Heritage Sites within the United States. The largest prehistoric earthen construction in the Americas north of Mexico, the site is open to the public and administered by the Illinois Historic Preservation Division and supported by the Cahokia Mounds Museum Society. In celebration of the 2018 Illinois state bicentennial, the Cahokia Mounds were selected as one of the Illinois 200 Great Places by the American Institute of Architects Illinois component (AIA Illinois). It was recognized by USA Today Travel magazine, as one of the selections for 'Illinois 25 Must See Places'.

History

Development (9th and 10th centuries)

Although some evidence exists of occupation during the Late Archaic period (around 1200 BCE) in and around the site, Cahokia as it is now defined was settled around 600 CE during the Late Woodland period.  Mound building at this location began with the emergent Mississippian cultural period, around the 9th century CE. The inhabitants left no written records beyond symbols on pottery, shell, copper, wood, and stone, but the elaborately planned community, woodhenge, mounds, and burials reveal a complex and sophisticated society.

The city's complex construction of earthen mounds required digging, excavation and transportation by hand using woven baskets. Its highly planned large, smoothed-flat, ceremonial plazas, sited around the mounds, with homes for thousands connected by laid out pathways and courtyards, suggest the location served as a central religious pilgrimage city.

The city's original name is unknown. The mounds were later named after the Cahokia tribe, a historic Illiniwek people living in the area when the first French explorers arrived in the 17th century. As this was centuries after Cahokia was abandoned by its original inhabitants, the Cahokia tribe was not necessarily descended from the earlier Mississippian-era people. Most likely, multiple indigenous ethnic groups settled in the Cahokia Mounds area during the time of the city's apex.

Historian Daniel Richter notes that the apex of the city occurred during the Medieval Warming Period. This period appears to have fostered an agricultural revolution in upper North America, as the three-fold crops of maize, beans (legumes), and gourds (squash) were developed and adapted or bred to the temperate climates of the north from their origins in Mesoamerica. Richter also notes that Cahokia's advanced development coincided with the development in the Southwest of the Chaco Canyon society, which also produced large-scale works in an apparent socially stratified society. The decline of the city coincides with the Little Ice Age, although by then, the three-fold agriculture remained well-established throughout temperate North America.

Rise and peak (11th and 12th centuries)

Cahokia became the most important center for the Mississippian culture. This culture was expressed in settlements that ranged along major waterways across what is now the Midwest, Eastern, and Southeastern United States. Cahokia was located in a strategic position near the confluence of the Mississippi, Missouri, and Illinois rivers. It maintained trade links with communities as far away as the Great Lakes to the north and the Gulf Coast to the south, trading in such exotic items as copper, Mill Creek chert, and whelk shells.

Mill Creek chert, most notably, was used in the production of hoes, a high demand tool for farmers around Cahokia and other Mississippian centers. Cahokia's control of the manufacture and distribution of these hand tools was an important economic activity that allowed the city to thrive. Mississippian culture pottery and stone tools in the Cahokian style were found at the Silvernale site near Red Wing, Minnesota, and materials and trade goods from Pennsylvania, the Gulf Coast, and Lake Superior have been excavated at Cahokia. Bartering, not money, was used in trade.

At the high point of its development, Cahokia was the largest urban center north of the great Mesoamerican cities in Mexico and Central America. Home to about 1,000 people before circa 1050, its population grew rapidly after that date. Archaeologists estimate the city's population at between 6,000 and 40,000 at its peak, with more people living in outlying farming villages that supplied the main urban center. 

As a result of archeological excavations in the early 21st century, new residential areas were found to the west of Cahokia; this discovery increased estimates of historic area population. If the highest population estimates are correct, Cahokia was larger than any subsequent city in the United States until the 1780s, when Philadelphia's population grew beyond 40,000. Its population may have been larger than contemporaneous London and Paris.

One of the major problems that large centers like Cahokia faced was keeping a steady supply of food. A related problem was waste disposal for the dense population, and Cahokia is believed to have become unhealthy from polluted waterways. Because it was such an unhealthy place to live, Snow believes that the town had to rely on social and political attractions to bring in a steady supply of new immigrants; otherwise, the town's death rate would have caused it to be abandoned earlier.

Decline (13th and 14th centuries)

The population of Cahokia began to decline during the 13th century, and the site was abandoned by around 1350. Scholars have proposed environmental factors, such as environmental degradation through overhunting, deforestation and pollution, and climatic changes, such as increased flooding and droughts, as explanations for abandonment of the site. However, more recent research suggests that there is no evidence of human-caused erosion or flooding at Cahokia.

Political and economic problems may also have contributed to the community's decline. It is likely that social and environmental factors combined to produce the conditions that led people to leave Cahokia.

Another possible cause is invasion by outside peoples, though the only evidence of warfare found are the defensive wooden stockade and watchtowers that enclosed Cahokia's main ceremonial precinct. There is no other evidence for warfare, so the palisade may have been more for ritual or formal separation than for military purposes. Diseases transmitted among the large, dense urban population are another possible cause of decline. Many theories since the late 20th century propose conquest-induced political collapse as the primary reason for Cahokia's abandonment.

Together with these factors, researchers found evidence in 2015 of major floods at Cahokia, so severe as to flood dwelling places. Analysis of sediment from beneath Horseshoe Lake has revealed that two major floods occurred in the period of settlement at Cahokia, in roughly 1100–1260 and 1340–1460.

Notable features

To achieve that, thousands of workers over decades moved more than an estimated  of earth in woven baskets to create this network of mounds and community plazas.

Monks Mound

Monks Mound is the largest structure and central focus of the city: a massive platform mound with four terraces, 10 stories tall, it is the largest man-made earthen mound north of Mexico. The mound was built higher and wider over the course of several centuries, through as many as 10 separate construction episodes, as the mound was built taller and the terraces and apron were added.

Monks Mounds was named for the community of Trappist monks who resided there for a short time, after Euroamericans settled in the area. Excavation on the top of Monks Mound has revealed evidence of a large building, likely a temple or the residence of the paramount chief, which would have been seen throughout the city.

The east and northwest sides of Monks Mound were twice excavated in August 2007 during an attempt to avoid erosion due to slumping. These areas were repaired to preserve the mound.

Urban landscape

Early in its history, Cahokia underwent a massive construction boom. Along with the early phase of Monks Mound, an overarching urban layout was established at the site. It was built with a symbolic quadripartite worldview and oriented toward the four cardinal directions with the main east-west and north-south axes defined with Monks Mound near its center point. Four large plazas were established to the east, west, north, and south of Monks Mound.

Researchers originally thought the flat, open terrain in this area reflected Cahokia's location on the Mississippi's alluvial flood plain, but instead soil studies have shown that the landscape was originally undulating ridge and swale topography. In one of the earliest large-scale construction projects, the site had been expertly and deliberately leveled and filled by the city's inhabitants. It is part of the sophisticated engineering displayed throughout the site. It was used for large ceremonies and gatherings, as well as for ritual games, such as chunkey. The game was played by rolling a disc-shaped chunky stone across the field. The men would throw spears where they thought the chunky stone would land. The game required a great deal of judgment and aim.

The major ceremonial north-south 'axis' connects the main precinct with the large ridgetop mortuary mound to its south now known as the Rattlesnake Mound (Mound 66). It is aligned 5° east of north, a direction thought to mimic the maximum southern moon rise of 5° west of north, albeit in reverse. This is thought to have had symbolic associations to the builders in connection with their lunar maize goddess of the underworld. This is further strengthened by its close proximity to the ridgetop mortuary Mound 72, the underworld connotations of the low water-filled area the causeway traversed, and its terminus at the mortuary complex at the Rattlesnake Mound. The causeway itself may have been seen as a symbolic "Path of Souls".

The high-status central district of Cahokia was surrounded by a 2-mi-long palisade that was equipped with protective bastions. A later addition to the site, when the palisade was constructed, it cut through and separated some pre-existing neighborhoods. Archaeologists found evidence of the stockade during excavation of the area and indications that it was rebuilt several times. Its bastions showed that it was mainly built for defensive purposes.

Beyond Monks Mound, as many as 120 more mounds stood at varying distances from the city center. To date, 109 mounds have been located, 68 of which are in the park area. The mounds are divided into three different types: platform, conical, and ridge-top. Each appeared to have had its own meaning and function.

Mound 72

During excavation of Mound 72, a ridge-top burial mound south of main urban precinct, archaeologists found the remains of a man in his 40s who was probably an important Cahokian ruler. The man was buried on a bed of more than 20,000 marine-shell disc beads arranged in the shape of a falcon, with the bird's head appearing beneath and beside the man's head, and its wings and tail beneath his arms and legs.

The falcon warrior or "birdman" is a common motif in Mississippian culture. This burial clearly had powerful iconographic significance. In addition, a cache of sophisticated, finely worked arrowheads in a variety of different styles and materials was found near the grave of this important man. Separated into four types, each from a different geographical region, the arrowheads demonstrated Cahokia's extensive trade links in North America.

Archeologists recovered more than 250 other skeletons from Mound 72. Scholars believe almost 62% of these were sacrificial victims, based on signs of ritual execution, method of burial, and other factors.  The skeletons include:
 Four young males, missing their hands and skulls
 A mass grave of more than 50 women around 21 years old, with the bodies arranged in two layers separated by matting
 A mass burial containing 40 men and women who appear to have been violently killed, some of these may have been buried alive: "From the vertical position of some of the fingers, which appear to have been digging in the sand, it is apparent that not all of the victims were dead when they were interred – that some had been trying to pull themselves out of the mass of bodies."

The relationship of these burials to the central burial is unclear. They were unlikely to have all deposited at the same time. Wood in several parts of the mound has been radiocarbon-dated to between 950 and 1000 CE.

Excavations have indicated that Mound 72 was not constructed as a single mound, but rather as a series of smaller mounds. These mounds were reshaped and covered over to give Mound 72 its final ridge-top shape.

Copper workshop

Excavations near Mound 34 from 2002 to 2010 revealed a copper workshop. This unique find was originally discovered in the 1950s by archaeologist Gregory Perino, but its exact location was lost for 60 years. It is the only known copper workshop to be found at a Mississippian culture site. The area contains the remains of three tree stumps thought to have been used to hold anvil stones. Analysis of copper found during excavations showed that it had been annealed, a technique involving repeatedly heating and cooling the metal as it is worked, as blacksmiths do with iron.

Artisans produced religious items, such as long-nosed god maskettes, ceremonial earrings with a symbolic shape, thought to have been used in fictive kinship rituals. Many of the stylistically related Mississippian copper plates, such as the Wulfing cache from southeastern Missouri, some of the Etowah plates from Georgia, and many of the Spiro plates from Oklahoma, are associated with the Greater Braden style and are thought to have been made in Cahokia in the 13th century.

Cahokia Woodhenge

They are thought to have been constructed between 900 and 1100 CE, with each one being larger and having 12 more posts than its predecessor. The site was discovered during salvage archaeology undertaken by Dr. Warren Wittry in the early 1960s interstate highway construction boom. Although the majority of the site contained village house features, a number of unusually shaped, large post holes were also discovered. When the holes were plotted out, they formed several arcs of equally spaced holes. Detailed analytical work supported the hypothesis that the placement of these posts was by design, and Wittry hypothesized that the arcs could be whole circles. He began referring to the circles as "woodhenges", comparing the structures to England's well-known circles at Woodhenge and Stonehenge.

Additional excavations in the 1960s–1980s used predictions based on verified posthole locations and spacing to locate other postholes and confirm the existence of five separate timber circles in the general vicinity. The circles are now designated Woodhenges I through V in Roman numerals. In 1985, a reconstruction of Woodhenge III was built with the posts being placed into the original excavated post positions. The circle, which has 48 posts in the circle and a 49th central post, has been used to investigate archaeoastronomy at Cahokia. The Illinois Historic Preservation Division that oversees the Cahokia site hosts public sunrise observations at the vernal and autumnal equinoxes and the winter and summer solstices. Out of respect for Native American beliefs, these events do not feature ceremonies or rituals of any kind.

Related mounds
Most of these mounds were leveled during the development of St. Louis, and much of their material was reused in construction projects.

The lone survivor of these mounds is Sugarloaf Mound. Located on the west bank of the Mississippi, it marked the initial border between St. Louis and the once autonomous city of Carondelet.

One of the largest Mississippian sites is Kincaid Mounds State Historic Site, located in Massac and Polk counties in southern Illinois. With a total of 19 mounds at the complex, it is considered the fifth-largest Mississippian site in terms of the number of monuments. It is believed to have been a chiefdom, as an elite burial mound was among those found. The site is designated as a National Historic Landmark.

Cahokia Museum and Interpretive Center

The Cahokia Museum and Interpretive Center, which receives up to a million visitors a year, was designed by AAIC Inc.  The building, which opened in 1989, received the Thomas H. Madigan Award, the St. Louis Construction News & Reviews Readers Choice Award, the Merit Award from the Metal Construction Association, and the Outstanding Achievement Award from the Brick Manufacturer Association.

Designations
Cahokia Mounds was first protected by the state of Illinois in 1923 when its legislature authorized purchase of a state park. Later designation as a state historic site offered additional protection, but the site came under significant threat from the federal highway building program in the 1950s. The highway program reduced the site's integrity; however, it increased funding for emergency archeological investigations. These investigations became intensive, and today continue. They have resulted in the present understanding of the national and international significance of the site. The site was designated a National Historic Landmark on July 19, 1964, and listed on the National Register of Historic Places on October 15, 1966.

In 1982, UNESCO (the United Nations Educational, Scientific and Cultural Organization) designated the site a World Heritage Site. This is the only such self-contained site in Illinois and among 24 World Heritage Sites in the United States in 2009.

State Senator Evelyn M. Bowles wrote about the Cahokia Mounds site:

The designation has helped protect the property and attract funds to conduct research on this significant civilization.

See also
 American Bottom
 List of Mississippian sites
 Mississippian Ideological Interaction Sphere
 Mississippian stone statuary
 List of archaeoastronomical sites by country

Notes

References

Bibliography
 
 
 
 
 
 
 
 
 
  full text available at

Further reading
 Introductory Bibliography of Published Sources on Cahokia Archeology
 Scholarly Bibliography of Published Sources on Cahokia Archaeology

External links

 Cahokia Mounds Homepage
 Cahokia Mounds State Historic Site UNESCO collection on Google Arts and Culture
 Cahokia Mounds Photo Gallery
 Cahokia Mounds Information & Videos – Chickasaw.TV
 "Cahokia Mounds", Illinois Historic Preservation Agency
   "Metropolitan Life on the Mississippi", Washington Post, March 12, 1997
 Woodhenge and the Cahokia Mounds 
 IHPA video with narration on Cahokia
Illinois Great Places – Mounds
Society of Architectural Historians SAH ARCHIPEDIA entry on the Cahokia Mounds
 

 
Archaeological sites on the National Register of Historic Places in Illinois
Former populated places in Illinois
Middle Mississippian culture
Native American museums in Illinois
Archaeological museums in Illinois
Museums in St. Clair County, Illinois
State parks of Illinois
Former Native American populated places in the United States
Populated places established in the 7th century
Populated places disestablished in the 14th century
National Register of Historic Places in St. Clair County, Illinois
National Historic Landmarks in Illinois
World Heritage Sites in the United States
History of Greater St. Louis
Protected areas of St. Clair County, Illinois
Pre-historic cities in the United States
National Register of Historic Places in Madison County, Illinois
Mounds in Illinois
7th-century establishments in North America
14th-century disestablishments in North America
Pyramids in the United States
Tourist attractions in St. Louis